The 1965 Limerick Senior Hurling Championship was the 71st staging of the Limerick Senior Hurling Championship since its establishment by the Limerick County Board.

Cappamore were the defending champions.

On 24 October 1965, Patrickswell won the championship after a 2-16 to 0-04 defeat of St. Kieran's in the final. It was their first ever championship title.

Results

Final

References

Limerick Senior Hurling Championship
Limerick Senior Hurling Championship